No Plan B EP is an EP from Christian hip hop band Group 1 Crew. It was released on December 18, 2007 through Fervent Records.

Track listing

References 

Group 1 Crew albums
2007 EPs